Jack Carter's Law is a 1974 British crime novel written by Ted Lewis. It is a prequel to Lewis' best known work, Jack's Return Home (1970) which was adapted into the film Get Carter in 1971. On Christmas Eve, Jack Carter learns that a supergrass is about to inform to the police and put him and his associates away for lengthy prison sentences. Carter attempts to hunt down the informer, but it proves a far more dangerous task than he anticipates.

References

British crime novels
1974 British novels
Novels by Ted Lewis
Michael Joseph books